A tracking ship, also called a missile range instrumentation ship or range ship, is a ship equipped with antennas and electronics to support the launching and tracking of missiles and rockets. Since many missile ranges launch over ocean areas for safety reasons, range ships are used to extend the range of shore-based tracking facilities.

In the United States, the initial tracking ships were constructed by the U.S. Army and then the U.S. Air Force to support their missile programs. They were generally built on a surplus Liberty ship or Victory ship hull. By 1964, the U.S. Navy took over all the range ships and introduced more.

In some Navies, such a ship is also given the Type Designation "Vigilship" or "Veladora", with the Designation Letter "V" or Letters "VC".

Missile range instrumentation ships

Chinese PLA Strategic Support Force

The Chinese ships were purpose built vessels for their role in the navy and the space program.

 Yuanwang class
 Yuanwang 1, 1977 – present
 Yuanwang 2, 1978 – present
 Yuanwang 3, 1995 – present
 Yuanwang 4, 1999 – 2010
 Yuanwang 5, 2007 – present
 Yuanwang 6, 2007 – present

French Navy

The Poincaré was a converted tanker, but the Monge was a purpose-built ship.

Inactive
 Henri Poincaré, 1964–1992 — ex-Italian oil tanker

Active
 Monge, 1992–present — purpose-built

Indian Navy
 INS Dhruv, 2021–present
 INS Anvesh - 2022-present

Russian Navy / Soviet Navy

The Soviet and later Russian ships were purpose built vessels for their role.
 Kosmonaut Vladimir Komarov, 1966–1989 (scrapped)
 Akademik Sergei Korolev, 1970–1996 (scrapped)
 Kosmonavt Yuri Gagarin, 1971–1996 (scrapped)
 , 1978–2001 (museum attraction)
 , 1978–2006  (scrapped)
 , 1977–2000  (scrapped)
 , 1977–2000  (scrapped)
 , 1967–1989  (scrapped)
 , 1967–1989  (scrapped)
 , 1967–1989  (scrapped)
 , 1967–1989  (scrapped)
 SSV-33 Ural, 1989–2001 (laid up, scrapping in progress)
 , 1984–2000 (scrapped)
 , 1990

United States Navy/United States Air Force

The latter was delivered in January 2012 to replace USNS Observation Island (T-AGM-23) in 2014. Most of the USN and USAF tracking ships were converted into their role. Some ships were in service with NASA.

Inactive
 USNS Range Tracker (T-AGM-1),  1961–1969 - built as Victory ship (transport/freighter)
 USNS Range Recoverer (T-AGM-2),  1960–1972 - built for US Army
 USNS Longview (T-AGM-3),  1959–19? - built as Victory ship (transport/freighter)
 USNS Richfield (T-AGM-4),  1960–1968 - built as Victory ship (transport/freighter)
 USNS Sunnyvale (T-AGM-5),  1960–1974 - built as Victory ship (transport/freighter)
 USNS Watertown (T-AGM-6),  1960–1972 - built as Victory ship (transport/freighter)
 USNS Huntsville (T-AGM-7),  1960–1974 - built as Victory ship (transport/freighter)
 USNS Wheeling (T-AGM-8),  1962–1990 - built as Victory ship (transport/freighter)
 USNS General H. H. Arnold (T-AGM-9),  1961–1982 - built as C4 class troop ship
 USNS General Hoyt S. Vandenberg (T-AGM-10),  1963–1983 - built as C4 class troop ship
 USNS Twin Falls (T-AGM-11),  1964–1972 - built as Victory ship (transport/freighter)
 USNS American Mariner (T-AGM-12),  1959–1966 - built as Liberty ship (transport/freighter), US Coast Guard training ship
 USNS Sword Knot (T-AGM-13),  1950s–1982 - C1-M cargo ship built for US Maritime Commission
 USNS Rose Knot (T-AGM-14),  1950s–1969 - C1-M cargo ship built for US Maritime Commission
 USNS Coastal Sentry (T-AGM-15), 1950s–1972 - C1-M cargo ship built for US Maritime Commission
 USNS Coastal Crusader (T-AGM-16),  late 1950s–1976 - C1-M cargo ship built for US Maritime Commission
 USNS Timber Hitch (T-AGM-17),  1964–1969 - C1-M cargo ship built for US Maritime Commission
 USNS Sampan Hitch (T-AGM-18),  1964–1973 - C1-M cargo ship built for US Maritime Commission
 USNS Vanguard (T-AGM-19),  1964–1999 - built as Type T2-SE-A2 tanker
 USNS Redstone (T-AGM-20),  1964–1993 - built as Type T2-SE-A2 tanker
 USNS Mercury (T‑AGM‑21),  1964–1974? - built as Type T2-SE-A2 tanker
 USNS Range Sentinel (T-AGM-22),  1969–1974 - USN  (Victory ship variation) Sherburne (APA-205)
 USNS Observation Island (T-AGM-23),  1977–2014 - built as "Mariner" class merchant ship

Active
 USNS Waters (T-AGS-45), 1991–present
 USNS Invincible (T-AGM-24), 2000–present - built as ocean surveillance ship
 USNS Howard O. Lorenzen (T-AGM-25), 2012–present - purpose built to replace Observation Island.
 s (T-AGS 60-66)

See also

 Eastern Range
 List of ships of the United States Air Force
 Sea-Based X-Band Radar
 Western Launch and Test Range

References

Missile range instrumentation ships
Ship types
Cold War auxiliary ships of the United States
Maritime vessels related to spaceflight
Research vessels
Research vessels of the United States
Rockets and missiles
Signals intelligence